was a Japanese Admiral of the First Sino-Japanese War and the Russo-Japanese War. He commanded the Suma during the Battle of Tsushima and also a member of the House of Peers.

Biography
Born in Ueda Village, Iwate Prefecture as the second son of Rihei Tochiuchi, a samurai of the Morioka Domain. On 1891, he graduated from the Naval War College and served in the First Sino-Japanese War as squad leader of Kongō, squad leader of the Lushun Port Torpedo Laying Corps, and torpedo leader of Fusō. After the war, he became a torpedo training school instructor. In 1897, he went on a business trip to the United Kingdom as a member of the Asama navigation committee and returned to Japan in 1899 as the chief of the Asama torpedoes. In 1900, he served Gonnohyōe Yamamoto as Adjutant to the Ministry of the Navy and Secretary to the Minister of the Navy .

At the start of the Russo-Japanese War, he initially served as captain of the Miyako but after the Miyako was sunk by a mine. After temporarily serving as captain of Musashi and the temporary cruiser Hachimanmaru, he served as captain of the Suma during the Battle of Tsushima. After the war, he served as a military attaché to the British Embassy for three and a half years. In addition, he successively served as Commander of the 2nd Fleet, Commander of the 1st Fleet, Commander of the 4th Squadron, Commander of the 3rd Squadron, Chief of the Technical Headquarters and in 1917, became Vice Minister of the Navy .

In 1920, he was appointed Admiral of the Navy, served as Chief of the 1st Fleet, Commander-in-Chief of the Combined Fleet, Commander-in-Chief of the Sasebo Naval District, and Military Counselor, and was transferred to the Reserve in 1924. Afterwards, he was in opposition to the London Naval Treaty.

Court Ranks
Senior Eighth Rank (December 14, 1891)
Junior Seventh Rank (January 31, 1893)
Senior Seventh Rank (November 26, 1895)
Junior Sixth Rank (October 31, 1898)
Junior Fifth Rank (February 14, 1905)
Senior Fifth Rank (February 21, 1910)
Junior Fourth Rank (June 30, 1914)
Senior Fourth Rank (July 31, 1919)
Junior Third Rank (August 20, 1921)
Senior Third Rank (March 24, 1924)
Junior Second Rank (July 12, 1932)

Awards
Order of the Rising Sun, 6th Class (November 18, 1895)
Order of the Rising Sun, 3rd Class (December 28, 1901)
Order of the Golden Kite, 4th Class (April 1, 1906)
One  (February 16, 1912)
One  (March 23, 1921)
Order of the Sacred Treasure, 2nd Class (November 30, 1914)
Order of the Rising Sun, 1st Class (November 7, 1915)
Taishō 34th Military Service Medal (November 7, 1915)
Emblem of Great Honor (November 10, 1915)
First National Census Commemorative Emblem (July 1, 1921)

Foreign Awards
: Legion of Honor, Knight (April 4, 1901)

References

Bibliography
Combined Fleet Commander-in-Chief Senki Series No. 61, Shinjin Oraisha, 2003.
Ikuhiko Hata, Japanese Army and Navy Comprehensive Encyclopedia, 2nd Edition, University of Tokyo Press , 2005.
Misao Toyama (ed.), Army and Navy General Personnel Overview, Navy Edition, Fuyo Shobo Publishing, 1981.
Hideki Fukukawa, Dictionary of Japanese Naval Officers, Fuyo Shobo Publishing, 2000.
Hiromi Sano, A Study of Tochiuchi Sojiro, Hokkaido University of Education, Kushiro Campus, Japanese Language Education Laboratory, 2011.

1866 births
1932 deaths
People from Iwate Prefecture
People of Meiji-period Japan
Imperial Japanese Navy admirals
Imperial Japanese Naval Academy alumni
Japanese military personnel of the First Sino-Japanese War
Japanese military personnel of the Russo-Japanese War
Recipients of the Order of the Golden Kite
Recipients of the Order of the Rising Sun, 3rd class
Grand Cordons of the Order of the Rising Sun
Chevaliers of the Légion d'honneur